The football (soccer) Campeonato Brasileiro Série B 1991, the second level of Brazilian National League, was played from February to May 1991. The competition had 64 clubs and two of them were promoted to Série A. The competition was won by Paysandu.

First phase

Group 1

Group 2

Group 3

Group 4

Group 5

Group 6

Group 7

Group 8

Second phase

Quarterfinals

Semifinals

Final

Sources

Campeonato Brasileiro Série B seasons
1991 in Brazilian football leagues